Luzia Nunes is a settlement in the southwestern part of the island of Fogo, Cape Verde. It is situated 1.5 km west of Patim, 2 km southeast of Vicente Dias and 7 km southeast of the island capital São Filipe. At the 2010 census its population was 438.

See also
List of villages and settlements in Cape Verde

References

Villages and settlements in Fogo, Cape Verde
São Filipe, Cape Verde